Ali Al-Khadrawi (born 31 May 1997) is a Saudi Arabian table tennis player. He competed in the 2020 Summer Olympics.

References

External links
 

1997 births
Living people
People from Qatif
People from Ratingen
Sportspeople from Düsseldorf (region)
Table tennis players at the 2020 Summer Olympics
Saudi Arabian male table tennis players
Olympic table tennis players of Saudi Arabia
Table tennis players at the 2014 Asian Games
20th-century Saudi Arabian people
21st-century Saudi Arabian people